Willy Trumpp (28 July 1904 – 1999) was a German footballer. He played club football with Eintracht Frankfurt.

In 1920 Trumpp joined Eintracht from fellow Frankfurt team BSC 1919. In the 1923–24 season he earned the regular goalkeeper spot and his brilliant saves rescued Eintracht from a possible relegation. His biggest sportive success was winning the Southern German championship in 1930. After this season he took a back seat and practised as a dentist in the Frankfurt borough of Praunheim.
Nevertheless he remained an Eintracht member and helped rebuilding the club's football section after World War II. From 1965 to 1969 he was part of the club's council of elders. After being awarded with the silver and golden badge of honour, Willy Trumpp was awarded the Eintracht Frankfurt honorary club membership for his long year work at the club. Additionally, the state of Hesse awarded him the state honorary prize.
Trumpp was a regular attendee of Eintracht home matches until the early 1990s.

Honours 

 Southern German championship:
 Champion: 1930
 Runner-up: 1927–28
 Bezirksliga Main-Hessen:
 Winner: 1927–28, 1928–29, 1929–30

Sources

External links
 Willy Trumpp at eintracht-archiv.de

1904 births
1999 deaths
German footballers
Eintracht Frankfurt players
Footballers from Frankfurt
Association football goalkeepers
German dentists
20th-century dentists